The 1993–94 Arkansas Razorbacks men's basketball team represented the University of Arkansas in the 1993–94 NCAA Division I men's basketball season. It was Nolan Richardson's ninth season as head coach at Arkansas. The Razorbacks played their home games at Bud Walton Arena in Fayetteville, Arkansas as members of the West Division of the Southeastern Conference. Arkansas finished the season 31–3, 14–2 in SEC play to win the West Division and regular season overall championships. The Hogs defeated Georgia in the quarterfinals of the SEC tournament before losing to Kentucky in the semifinals. The Razorbacks received an at-large bid to the NCAA tournament as the 1 seed in the Midwest Regional, their seventh straight trip to the tournament. Arkansas defeated North Carolina A&T and Georgetown to advance to the Sweet Sixteen for the fourth time in five years. There the Razorbacks defeated Tulsa and Michigan to earn a trip to the Final Four. It was Arkansas's fifth trip to the Final Four in program history. In the Final Four, they defeated Arizona before beating Duke in the National Championship game. Thanks to Scotty Thurman's high arching three-point shot with less than a minute to play in the national championship game, the team earned its first national championship in school history. Thurman's shot is known as the "Shot heard 'round Arkansas", and is considered one of the greatest plays in Arkansas Razorbacks sports history. Corliss Williamson was named the Most Outstanding Player of the tournament. 1993-94 is considered the greatest single season in Arkansas' ninety-eight year history of men's basketball.

Previous season 
The Razorbacks finished the 1992–93 season 22–9, 10–6 in SEC play to win the SEC West Division championship. Arkansas defeated Georgia before losing in the semifinals of the SEC tournament to Kentucky. The Razorbacks received an at-large bid to the NCAA tournament as the 4 seed in the East Regional. Arkansas defeated Holy Cross and St. John's to advance to the Sweet Sixteen for the third time in four years. There they lost to 4th-ranked and eventual national champion North Carolina. This team was dubbed "Richardson's Runts", due to the fact that Dwight Stewart was the tallest player on the team at 6'9".

Roster

Schedule and results

|-
!colspan=12 style=| Regular season

|-
!colspan=9 style=|SEC Tournament

|-
!colspan=9 style=|NCAA tournament

Sources

Rankings

Awards and honors
 Nolan Richardson, Naismith College Coach of the Year 
Nolan Richardson, SEC Men's Basketball Coach of the Year 
 Corliss Williamson, NCAA Men's MOP Award
Corliss Williamson, Second Team, 1994 NCAA Men's Basketball All-Americans
Corliss Williamson, SEC Men's Basketball Player of the Year 
Corliss Williamson, 1st team All-SEC
Scotty Thurman, Honorable Mention, 1994 NCAA Men's Basketball All-Americans 
Scotty Thurman, 1st team All-SEC

Team players drafted into the NBA

Corey Beck and Clint McDaniel played in the NBA as undrafted free agents.

References

Arkansas
Arkansas Razorbacks men's basketball seasons
NCAA Division I men's basketball tournament championship seasons
NCAA Division I men's basketball tournament Final Four seasons
Arkansas
Razor
Razor